Samuel Hunter (21 August 1894 – 5 July 1976) was a British cyclist. He competed in two events at the 1924 Summer Olympics.

References

External links
 

1894 births
1976 deaths
British male cyclists
Olympic cyclists of Great Britain
Cyclists at the 1924 Summer Olympics
People from Hatfield, Hertfordshire
Sportspeople from Hertfordshire
20th-century British people